Soultz-les-Bains (historical) is a commune in the Bas-Rhin department in Grand Est, France.

In 1682, the famous military engineer Vauban constructed the Canal de la Bruche between Soultz and Strasbourg. The canal was needed in order to transport sandstone from the quarries of Soultz for use in his fortification of Strasbourg. The canal carried its last commercial load in 1939 and was formally closed in 1957.

See also
 Église Saint-Maurice, Soultz-les-Bains
 Communes of the Bas-Rhin department

References

Communes of Bas-Rhin
Bas-Rhin communes articles needing translation from French Wikipedia